Chahar Borj-e Sofla (also Romanized as Chahār Borj-e Soflá; also known as Chahār Borj-e Pā’īn) is a village in Garmkhan Rural District, Garmkhan District, Bojnord County, North Khorasan Province, Iran. At the 2006 census, its population was 36, in 9 families.

References 

Populated places in Bojnord County